The Reuben Freeman House is a unique home, it sports eight gables and was built 1887 in Inver Grove Heights in the U.S. state of Minnesota. Freeman was a German immigrant farmer who collected stones from his acreage to build his coursed fieldstone house. Bottle glass adorns the masonry around the second-story windows, further proving his eccentricity.

References

Houses completed in 1887
Houses in Dakota County, Minnesota
Houses on the National Register of Historic Places in Minnesota
National Register of Historic Places in Dakota County, Minnesota